Steele Chambers is an American football linebacker for the Ohio State Buckeyes.

Early life and high school career
Chambers attended Blessed Trinity Catholic High School in Roswell, Georgia. He played linebacker and running back in high school. He committed to Ohio State University to play college football.

College career
Chambers played running back his first two years at Ohio State in 2019 and 2020, before switching to linebacker prior to the 2021 season. As a running back he had 28 carries for 221 yards and one touchdown. In his first year as a linebacker, Chambers started four of 13 games and had 47 tackles, one sack and one interception. He returned to Ohio State as a starter in 2022.

References

External links
Ohio State Buckeyes bio

Living people
Players of American football from Georgia (U.S. state)
American football linebackers
American football running backs
Ohio State Buckeyes football players
Year of birth missing (living people)